Bordallo is a surname. Notable people with the surname include:

Madeleine Bordallo (born 1933), Guamanian politician
Ricardo Bordallo (1927–1990), Guamanian politician and businessman